Events in the year 2020 in Kyrgyzstan.

Incumbents 

 President – Sooronbay Jeenbekov (until 15 October)
 Prime Minister – Mukhammedkalyi Abylgaziev (until 15 June); Kubatbek Boronov (17 June-9 October); Sadyr Japarov (since 14 October)

Events 
Ongoing – COVID-19 pandemic in Kyrgyzstan

March 
 18 March – The first three cases of COVID-19 in the country were confirmed, after a citizen returned from Saudi Arabia according to the nation's health ministry.

June 
 15 June – Prime Minister Abylgaziev resigned from his post as Prime Minister in connection with allegations against the government in a criminal case on the extension and renewal of radio frequency resources.
 17 June – The Supreme Council of Kyrgyzstan confirms former first deputy prime minister Kubatbek Boronov as the new prime minister.
23 June – Judge Emilbek Kaipov of the Birinchi Mai District Court sentenced former President Almazbek Atambayev to 11 years and two months in prison on corruption charges. Former Prosecutor-General Indira Joldubaeva, former chief of the Hematology Center Abdukhalim Raimjanov, and Kalybek Kachkynaliev, a former adviser to the State Penitentiary Service chief, were also found guilty.

July 
17 July – The country announces the addition of thousands of cases and hundreds of deaths to its COVID-19 tallies, describing the corresponding pneumonia-related cases, which had not been confirmed by tests, as most likely linked to the SARS-CoV-2 virus.

September 
2 September – The number of COVID-19 cases in the country reaches past 44,000.
11 September – The number of recoveries of COVID-19 in the country reaches past 40,000.

October 
 From 5 October – 2020 Kyrgyzstani protests
 9 October – Prime Minister Kubatbek Boronov resigns.
 15 October – President Sooronbay Jeenbekov resigns.

Deaths

See also 
2020 in Kyrgyzstan
2020 in Kyrgyzstani sport

References

 
Years of the 21st century in Kyrgyzstan
Kyrgyzstan
Kyrgyzstan
2020s in Kyrgyzstan